Narcotango en vivo is a live album by Argentine Carlos Libedinsky.

Track listing 

2008 albums
Carlos Libedinsky albums